Jung-mo is a Korean masculine given name. Its meaning differs based on the hanja used to write each syllable of the name. There are 75 hanja with the reading "jung" and 27 hanja with the reading "mo" on the South Korean government's official list of hanja which may be used in given names.

People with this name include:
Jung-Mo Lee (born 1944), South Korean cognitive psychologist
Yang Jung-mo (born 1953), South Korean freestyle wrestler
Jung Mo Sung (born 1957), South Korean-born Brazilian theologian

See also
List of Korean given names

References

Korean masculine given names